Per Pedersen Lyngemark, also known as Per Jørgensen, (23 May 1941 – 2 April 2010) was a Danish amateur track cyclist. Competing in the 4000 m team pursuit he won a gold medal at the 1968 Olympics and the national title in 1968 and 1972.

References 

1941 births
2010 deaths
Cyclists at the 1968 Summer Olympics
Olympic cyclists of Denmark
Olympic gold medalists for Denmark
Danish male cyclists
Olympic medalists in cycling
Sportspeople from Frederiksberg
Medalists at the 1968 Summer Olympics
Danish track cyclists